George Muirhead may refer to:
 George Muirhead (linguist)
 George Muirhead (minister)
 George Muirhead (naturalist)
 George Muirhead, Australian farmer, see Principality of Marlborough